Trent Haaga (born 1971) is an American actor, screenwriter, producer, and director. He is best known for his work on independent horror films, such as Deadgirl (2008), Cheap Thrills (2013), and 68 Kill (2017).

Career
Haaga came to the attention of the horror community after co-starring in the Troma film Terror Firmer. He went on to fill the role of screenwriter as well as assistant director on the fourth film in the Toxic Avenger series, Citizen Toxie: The Toxic Avenger IV. Due to also playing the leader of the Diaper Mafia in this film, he was forced to direct many scenes in the film while wearing a baby bonnet and an adult diaper.  He relates many of these experiences as co-author of the book Make Your Own Damn Movie! written with Lloyd Kaufman of Troma.

He has worked in many aspects of filmmaking (writing, producing, acting) and enjoys them all.

Haaga works in independent film and has stated that he likes the advances made in digital cinematography.

Haaga has praised the speed of digital filmmaking.

Haaga directorial debut Chop, which stars Tanishaa Mukherji and Billy Bakshi, was released in 2011. He wrote the script for the independent thriller alongside Adam Minarovich. The movie is a revenge thriller within the tradition of Fargo and Oldboy. Haaga narrated the Indie thriller flick Fetch.

Haaga has also written for video games; he worked on the DLC for the survival horror game The Evil Within and was the lead writer on the game's sequel.  The story for The Evil Within 2 was created by the Japanese developers and Haaga was tasked with fleshing out the characters in the game.

Filmography

Acting credits

Directing credits 
 Deathcember (2019)
 68 Kill (2017)
 Chop (2011)

Writing credits
Citizen Toxie: The Toxic Avenger IV (2000) (writer)
Hell Asylum (2002) (V) (writer)
Feeding the Masses (2004) (V) (writer)
Damage Control (2005) TV series (unknown episodes)
Raving Maniacs (2005) (screenplay)
Make Your Own Damn Movie! (2005) (book)
Deadgirl (2008) (writer)
Poor Things (2008) (screenplay) (story)
Fetch (2009)
Cheap Thrills (2013) (writer)
Killing Mommy (2016) (writer) (TV Movie)
68 Kill (2017) (screenplay) (director)
The Evil Within 2 (2017) (video game) (writer)
It Came From the Desert (2017) (writer)
Girl on the Third Floor (2019) (writer)
Deathcember (writer) (2019) (segment "Operation Dolph)

Producer credits
Killjoy 2: Deliverance from Evil (2002) (line producer)
Dead & Rotting (2002) (producer)
Hell Asylum (2002) (line producer)
The Ghouls (2003) (associate producer)
Easter Bunny, Kill! Kill! (2006) (producer)
Chop (2011) (producter)
The Dead Reborn (2013) (producer)

References

External links
 
 

1971 births
Living people
American male film actors
American male screenwriters
American film producers
21st-century American male actors
21st-century American screenwriters
Male actors from Los Angeles
Screenwriters from California
Film producers from California
Film directors from Los Angeles
Writers from Los Angeles
21st-century American male writers